Jay Edwards (born January 3, 1969) is an American former professional basketball player.

Edwards was selected by the Los Angeles Clippers in the second round (33rd overall) of the 1989 NBA Draft. A 6'4" guard from Indiana University, Edwards played in only four games for the Clippers in his NBA career. He also played overseas for a few seasons.

He entered the NBA after playing only two seasons for the Hoosiers. During his sophomore year at Indiana, he averaged 20.0 points per game and once held the school record for 20 consecutive games with a three-pointer , leading the Hoosiers to the 1989 Big Ten title. Edwards was the Big Ten Freshman of the Year in 1988 and an All-American in 1989.

When Edwards was in high school in Marion, Indiana, he and his teammate, Lyndon Jones, led the Marion Giants to three consecutive state championships. The three-peat was known in Indiana as the "Purple Reign" referring to the schools colors of purple and gold. In 1987 Edwards shared the title of Indiana's "Mr. Basketball" award along with Jones. Edwards and Jones would also play together for two years at Indiana University.

In high school, Jay was given the nickname "Silk" for his gracefully smooth jump shot.

Edwards continues to hold the NCAA freshman single-season record for three-point field goal shooting percentage (53.6%).

Notes

1969 births
Living people
20th-century African-American sportspeople
21st-century African-American people
African-American basketball players
All-American college men's basketball players
American expatriate basketball people in Argentina
American expatriate basketball people in Israel
American expatriate basketball people in the Philippines
American expatriate basketball people in Spain
American men's basketball players
Basketball players from Indiana
CB Peñas Huesca players
Connecticut Pride players
Fort Wayne Fury players
Gimnasia y Esgrima de Comodoro Rivadavia basketball players
Indiana Hoosiers men's basketball players
Ironi Ashkelon players
Liga ACB players
Los Angeles Clippers draft picks
Los Angeles Clippers players
McDonald's High School All-Americans
Parade High School All-Americans (boys' basketball)
People from Marion, Indiana
Philippine Basketball Association imports
Rapid City Thrillers players
Rochester Renegade players
Shooting guards
Sta. Lucia Realtors players